
Year 270 (CCLXX) was a common year starting on Saturday (link will display the full calendar) of the Julian calendar. At the time, it was known as the Year of the Consulship of Antiochianus and Orfitus (or, less frequently, year 1023 Ab urbe condita). The denomination 270 for this year has been used since the early medieval period, when the Anno Domini calendar era became the prevalent method in Europe for naming years.

Events 
 By place 

 Roman Empire 
 Emperor Claudius II Gothicus fights a drawn-out campaign against the Gothic raiders in the Balkans, with setbacks suffered on both sides. Eventually, many Goths die of plague and others are absorbed into the Roman legions.
 Zenobia seizes control of Roman Arabia and Egypt.
 Claudius dies of plague in Sirmium while preparing to fight the Vandals and Sarmatians, who have invaded Pannonia. He is succeeded by his brother Quintillus, who briefly holds power over the Roman Empire.
 Victorinus besieges and sacks the city of Autun, which had declared allegiance to Claudius.
 Lucius Domitius Aurelianus (or Aurelian), the cavalry commander who distinguished himself in the previous year at the Battle of Naissus (Serbia), usurps power in Sirmium and marches against Quintillus in Aquileia. Quintillus commits suicide.
 Aurelius defeats an incursion by the Iuthungi into Raetia, defeating them as they attempted to re-cross the Danube.

 Asia 
Fan Hsiung, aka Pham Hung, comes to power in Champa and raids the Chinese-occupied territory of Tonkin.
Seocheon becomes ruler of the Korean kingdom of Goguryeo.

 Africa 
 The Kingdom of Aksum (modern Ethiopia) begins minting its own gold coins to facilitate international trade, following the model of Roman coinage.
 Anthony the Great, a Christian saint from Egypt, regarded as "Father of All Monks", enters the wilderness to become ascetic.

Births 
 March 15 – Saint Nicholas (Santa Claus) (d. 343)
 Liu Kun, Chinese general and poet (d. 318)
 Rabbah bar Nahmani, Babylonian 'amora
 Saint Spyridon, bishop of Trimythous (d. 348)

Deaths 
 Claudius II (Gothicus), Roman emperor (b. 214)
 Gregory Thaumaturgus, Christian bishop and theologian
 Luo Xian (or Lingze), Chinese general and politician
 Plotinus, Greek philosopher and founder Neoplatonism
 Qiao Zhou (or Yunnan), Chinese official and politician
 Quintillus, Roman emperor and brother of Claudius II
 Shapur I (the Great), ruler of the Sassanid Empire
 Shi Ji (or Zhu Ji), Chinese general and governor
 Sun Fen, Chinese prince of the Eastern Wu state

References